The Sarah Devens Award is given as a joint award between the ECAC Hockey and Hockey East conferences to a women's ice hockey player. The criteria for the Devens Award is for a player who demonstrates leadership and commitment both on and off the ice. Both conferences submitted a league nominee for consideration and the winner is also given a post-graduate scholarship of $10,000. The award is named in honor of former Dartmouth Big Green ice hockey player, Sarah Devens, who died in 1995 prior to her senior year.

List of winners

See also
 National Collegiate Women's Ice Hockey Championship

References

^
College women's ice hockey in the United States